The High Commissioner of Malaysia to the Nation of Brunei, the Abode of Peace is the head of Malaysia's diplomatic mission to Brunei. The position has the rank and status of an Ambassador Extraordinary and Plenipotentiary and is based in the High Commission of Malaysia, Bandar Seri Begawan.

List of heads of mission

High Commissioners to Brunei

See also
 Brunei–Malaysia relations

References 

 
Brunei
Malaysia